Samuel Rubin may refer to:

 Samuel M. Rubin concessionaire and businessman
 Samuel Rubin (philanthropist)